Henry Ryan Haney (1835 – November 17, 1878) was an Ontario physician and political figure. He represented Monck in the Legislative Assembly of Ontario as a Liberal member from 1872 to 1878.

He served as coroner for Welland. He was first elected to the provincial legislature in an 1872 by-election after the sitting member, Lachlin McCallum, resigned when it became illegal for members to sit in both the House of Commons of Canada and the Ontario legislature. Haney was reelected in 1875 but unseated on appeal; he was elected in the by-election that followed and represented Monck until his death in 1878.

References

External links 

The Canadian parliamentary companion and annual register, 1877, CH Mackintosh

1835 births
1878 deaths
Canadian coroners
Ontario Liberal Party MPPs